Memorial Day is the debut album released by rapper Full Blooded. It was released on December 1, 1998, by No Limit Records and produced by Beats By the Pound. Memorial Day peaked at No. 112 on the Billboard 200, No. 20 on the Top R&B/Hip-Hop Albums chart and No. 1 on the Top Heatseekers chart, selling 5,320 copies its first week. Following this album, Full Blooded released one independent album entitled Untamed before disappearing from the music business. As of 2002, the album had sold 12,851 copies.

Track listing
"Dog Shit"- 2:10 (featuring Nite Tyme of Hounds Of Gert Town) 
"Quickest Way to Die"- 4:13 (featuring Mo B. Dick) 
"Foes Bleed Bullets"- 3:25  (featuring Hounds Of Gert Town)
"Sleep No More"- 3:56 (featuring Hounds Of Gert Town)
"Same Ole Nigga"- 3:03  
"I'm Gonna Hustle"- 3:57 (featuring C-Murder & Big Ed) 
"Out of Sight, Out of Mind"- 4:10 (featuring Dolliole of GC & Ms. Peaches) 
"My Day Gon Come"- 3:54  (featuring Mo B. Dick)
"Gangsta Shit"- 3:40 (featuring Snoop Dogg) 
"Bad Dreams"- 4:13 (featuring Hounds Of Gert Town)
"Head Busting"- 4:03 (featuring Dolliole of Ghetto Commission & Hounds Of Gert Town)
"Red Rum"- 4:17 (featuring Nite Tyme of Hounds Of Gert Town) 
"Give 'Em Some"- 4:32  
"Dog Fight"- 3:22 (featuring Ghetto Commission) 
"Count Down"- 3:59 (featuring Camouflage of Hounds Of Gert Town & Steady Mobb'n)  
"Full Blooded"- 4:00

1998 debut albums
No Limit Records albums
Priority Records albums
Full Blooded albums